Rio Pro is an event on the ASP World Surfing Tour. The event is held every year at Rio de Janeiro, (RJ, Brazil) in May.

Results

Men's

Women's

See also

Surfing in Brazil

References

External links

 
World Surf League
Surfing competitions in Brazil
Sports competitions in Rio de Janeiro (city)
Recurring sporting events established in 2011
International sports competitions hosted by Brazil